Fulgenzio Mondini (17th-century) was an Italian painter of the Baroque era. 

He was born at Bologna, and was active there in 1658. He excelled in delineating historical subjects, and studied under Guercino. He painted some frescoes depicting Life of St Anthony of Padua for San Petronio, Bologna

Malvasia speaks very highly of Mondini. Mondini painted figures for Giacomo Alboresi in frescoes. This painter died at Florence, where he was working for Marchese Capponi in his villa at Colonnata in the prime of life.

References

Year of birth unknown
Year of death unknown
17th-century Italian painters
Italian male painters
Painters from Bologna
Italian Baroque painters